Sam Moore, born Salim Ziady, (October 25, 1929 – June 1, 2018) was a Lebanese-born American publisher. He was the chief executive officer of Thomas Nelson from 1969 to 2005.

Early life
Moore was born on October 25, 1929, in Beirut, Lebanon. He emigrated to the United States in the 1950s to attend Columbia International University, followed by the University of South Carolina.

Career
Moore began his career in 1958 in Nashville as the founder of the National Book Publishers. In 1961, with the help of Jack C. Massey, Moore founded Royal Publishing. He merged it with Thomas Nelson in the 1960s.

Moore served as the chief executive officer of Thomas Nelson from 1969 to 2005. In 1983, he decided to publish the New King James Version, and it became a best-seller. Other best-selling authors picked by Moore included John C. Maxwell, Zig Ziglar and Jerry Falwell, the founder of Liberty University, which Moore supported financially.

Personal life and death
Moore had a wife, Peggy, and three children.

Moore died on June 1, 2018, at 88.

References

1929 births
2018 deaths
Businesspeople from Beirut
People from Nashville, Tennessee
Lebanese emigrants to the United States
Columbia International University alumni
University of South Carolina alumni
Businesspeople from Tennessee
American chief executives
20th-century American businesspeople